Lost Boys: The Thirst is a 2010 American black comedy action horror film directed by Dario Piana and stars Corey Feldman, Casey B. Dolan, Tanit Phoenix and Jamison Newlander. It is a sequel to Lost Boys: The Tribe (2008) and the third and final film of The Lost Boys trilogy.

Plot
In Washington, D.C., Edgar and Alan Frog interrupt a half-vampire Senator who is killing a Congressman to finish his transformation. In the ensuing chaos, Alan is forced to drink vampire blood, which will make him a half-vampire.

Five years later, in San Cazador, California, Edgar faces eviction from his trailer and tries to raise funds by selling his collection of old comic books to his friend Zoe, who works at a local comics shop. While there, a famous blogger named Johnny Trash enters; Zoe explains that Johnny is there for a rave that's going on in the town.

Back at his trailer, Edgar is approached by Gwen Lieber, a writer of romantic vampire novels, whose brother Peter was kidnapped during a rave in Ibiza, Spain, and she suspects vampiric activity. She gives him a vial of a drug called "The Thirst" which is given to people at raves hosted by a person known as "DJ X"; he determines that it is vampire blood. Gwen offers him a large sum of money to rescue her brother, but he turns it down.

DJ X and his associates are transporting Peter—bound and drugged—in a small plane. DJ X and three others jump from the plane in flight, landing safely to meet Johnny Trash for a live interview. DJ X mauls Johnny afterward since the blogger had served his purpose in promoting the rave online.

Edgar visits Alan, who is now a half-vampire and satisfies his thirst for blood by feeding on animal blood acquired in his job as a taxidermist. Edgar tries to enlist Alan's aid in stopping DJ X from raising an army through his raves, but he refuses, having lost all hope that he can be saved and believing that the whole Alpha Vampire theory is just a "never-ending pyramid scheme."

Edgar resolves to take the job alone, remembering his youthful days with Alan and Sam Emerson. But Gwen introduces him to Lars Van Goetz, a former reality TV star hoping to use the mission to make him famous again; Edgar reluctantly accepts his help.

After a visit to the grave of Sam Emerson (whom Edgar was forced to kill when he turned into a vampire), in which Edgar returns to Sam the Batman #14 that Sam had boasted having when they met, Edgar finds that Alan has left him a book of vampire history to help in his mission. Edgar gives the book to Zoe to research. A vampire attacks her, but she and Edgar defeat it, and she explains what she has learned about a ritual sacrifice during a Blood Moon, such as the one that will occur the night of the rave.

Congressman Blake, now Edgar's weapons designer (for a fee) outfits Edgar and Zoe for battle. After fighting off an attack on Blake's house, they meet up with Gwen, Lars, and Claus, and set off for the island where the rave is taking place. Leaving Gwen behind for her safety, the remaining four go inside in search of Peter. Lars finds him, but thinking that the whole thing is staged, leaves Peter to rescue him at a more dramatic time. As they fight various vampires, Lars has his heart ripped out by one of them and Edgar is injured by Lily, but rejoins Gwen, Claus, and Zoe in returning to the building.

DJ X is distributing The Thirst to the crowd, and preparing to sacrifice Peter. Edgar takes on DJ X, and is narrowly saved by the timely arrival of Alan. The vampire hunters rally, and Edgar impales DJ X with a resin spike grenade (a weapon stolen from Area 51 by Congressman Blake) before he and Alan finish him off with swords through the heart.

To their surprise, the death of DJ X doesn't cause the half-vampires to revert. They discover that Peter was the real alpha vampire, whose power DJ X was attempting to extract (and that Gwen and Peter are actually lovers, not siblings). Gwen's rescue mission was also a ruse to bring Edgar to Peter, who wanted him to become his personal vampire hit-man, to keep other vampires under control. Peter kills Gwen instead of turning her like she wanted, and orders the other vampires to kill Edgar and the rest. Peter attempts to use his partial control over Alan against Edgar, but Edgar douses Peter with water which he simultaneously blesses into holy water, destroying Peter and returning everyone else to normal.

Later, as Alan enjoys getting his first suntan in years, Zoe and Edgar reflect on their adventure. Edgar wonders about her knowledge that vampires were real, which she dismisses as "a hunch". Edgar comments about something he's just read about female werewolves being able to transform at any time, and the film ends with Zoe's face as she becomes a werewolf.

Cast
 Corey Feldman as Edgar Frog
 Casey B. Dolan as Zoe
 Tanit Phoenix as Gwen Lieber
 Jamison Newlander as Alan Frog
 Seb Castang as DJ X
 Felix Mosse as Peter
 Stephen Van Niekerk as Lars Van Goetz
 Joe Vaz as Claus
 Hennie Bosman as Kirk O'Dale 
 Tanya van Graan as Lily 
 Ingrida Kraus as Vixen  
 Sean Michael as Ira Pinkus
 Matthew Dylan Roberts as Congressman Blake
 Porteus Xandau Steenkamp as Johnny Trash
 Corey Haim as Sam Emerson (clips from the first film)

Production
Filming began on location in South Africa in November 2009. Corey Haim had originally confirmed that he would not be participating in the film, citing a very busy schedule. He had said he was looking forward to coming back for a fourth film, before his death in March 2010. The film dedicated to Haim from the end credits. It is the second sequel to the original 1987 film The Lost Boys, following Lost Boys: The Tribe. In this sequel, Corey Feldman and Jamison Newlander reprise their roles again as Edgar and Alan Frog.

Release
Warner Premiere set the DVD and Blu-ray release for October 12, 2010. It was less successful than the previous film, only earning $907,122 within the first 2 weeks of release while The Tribe had earned $3,548,278

Reception
The film received negative reviews from critics and, based on 7 reviews, currently holds a 0℅ on Rotten Tomatoes with an average rating of 3.42 out of 10.

See also
Vampire film

References

External links

Lost Boys: The Thirst at Upcoming Horror Movie
Corey Feldman Talks New Lost Boys Trilogy at The Movie Blog

American vampire films
2010s comedy horror films
American comedy horror films
English-language South African films
South African horror films
Warner Bros. direct-to-video films
Direct-to-video sequel films
Direct-to-video horror films
Films scored by Elia Cmíral
Films shot in South Africa
Films set in Washington, D.C.
The Lost Boys (franchise)
2010 comedy films
2010 films
Thunder Road Films films
2010s English-language films
2010s American films